The Roland Z-120 Relax is a German ultralight aircraft, designed and produced by Roland Aircraft of Mendig, introduced at the AERO Friedrichshafen show in 2015. The aircraft is supplied as a kit for amateur construction or complete and ready-to-fly.

Design and development
The Z-120 was designed to comply with the German 120 kg class rules, hence its designation. It features a cantilever high-wing, a single-seat, an enclosed cabin accessed by open doorways, fixed conventional landing gear and a single engine in tractor configuration.

The aircraft is made from special thin-gauge sheet aluminum for lightness. The standard engine used is a  Woelfe Aixro XF40 single-rotor Wankel engine.

Specifications (Z-120)

References

External links

Z-120
2010s German ultralight aircraft
Homebuilt aircraft
Single-engined tractor aircraft